Lorna Bennett (born 7 June 1952 in Newton, Saint Elizabeth Parish, Jamaica) is a Jamaican reggae singer who twice topped the Jamaican singles chart in the early 1970s, and who is best remembered for her reggae version of "Breakfast in Bed".

Biography
Born in St. Elizabeth, Bennett went to school in Kingston and while still at school began singing with the Bare Essential Band, who performed at the Excelsior nightclub. At one of these performances she was noticed by Geoffrey Chung of the Now Generation Band, who nurtured her early recording career. A recording of "Morning Has Broken" was not commercially successful, but led to producer Harry Johnson commissioning Chung to record Bennett's version of Dusty Springfield's "Breakfast in Bed" in 1972, given a reggae arrangement by Chung, which was a success both locally and in the United Kingdom and the United States. The b-side featured a deejay version of the track by Scotty. Bennett became the first female artist to top the singles chart in Jamaica for five years, a feat repeated with the follow-up, a cover of The Dixie Cups' "Chapel of Love". Further recordings followed, while Bennett at the same time studied Law at university, these forming her debut album, This is Lorna. Bennett put her music career on hold while she moved to Barbados to complete her degree, but on her return in 1974 recorded the Pluto Shervington song "Dancing to my Own Heartbeat". She then gave up her musical career, and moved back to St. Elizabeth and opened a legal practice.

In 2001, she decided to return to music, and performed at Christmas Vintage shows and the Heineken Startime concerts, as well as performances in Miami and Great Britain. She then began working on new material with Sly & Robbie. In 2003, Bennett delivered a eulogy at the funeral of David "Scotty" Scott, the deejay with whom she had shared her first number one single.

Discography

Albums
This is Lorna (1972) Harry J

Singles
"I Believe in You" (1970), Harry J
"Letter From Miami" (1970), Harry J/Decca
"Morning Has Broken" (1971)
"Breakfast in Bed" (1972), Harry J - JA #1
"Skank in Bed" (1972), Blue Mountain - with Scotty
"Going to the Chapel" (1973), Harry J - JA #1
"It Hurts to Want it so Bad", Harry J
"I Love Every Little Thing About You" (1973), Harry J
"I'm Satisfied", (197?), Harry J
"Stay With You Awhile" (197?), Harry J
"Run Johnny Run" (1975), Jaywax/Trojan
"Reverend Lee" (1976), Harry J/Trojan
"To the Other Woman" (1976), Harry J/Trojan
"Dancing to my Own Heartbeat" (1974), Wild Flower
"Ease Up", Elizabeth
"Stay With Me" (197?), Harung
"It's My House" (1979), High Note
"The Real Thing" (2006), Taxi
"Knock Knock" (2006), Taxi
"How U Like It" (2005), - featuring Spragga Benz

References

External links

1952 births
Living people
20th-century Jamaican women singers
Jamaican reggae singers
People from Saint Elizabeth Parish
Trojan Records artists
Island Records artists
21st-century Jamaican women singers